Cosmosoma eumelis is a moth of the family Erebidae. It was described by Herbert Druce in 1883. It is found in Ecuador, Bolivia and Brazil.

References

eumelis
Moths described in 1883